The 2017–18 Montana State Bobcats men's basketball team represented Montana State University during the 2017–18 NCAA Division I men's basketball season. The Bobcats, led by fourth-year head coach Brian Fish, played their home games at Brick Breeden Fieldhouse in Bozeman, Montana as members of the Big Sky Conference. They finished the season 13–19, 6–12 in Big Sky play to finish in a tie for eighth place. They lost in the first round of the Big Sky tournament to North Dakota.

Previous season
The Bobcats finished the 2016–17 season 16–16, 11–7 in Big Sky play to finish in a tie for fifth place. As the No. 6 seed in the Big Sky tournament, they lost in the first round to Southern Utah.

Offseason

Departures

2017 incoming recruits

2018 incoming recruits

Preseason 
In separate preseason polls of league coaches and media, the Bobcats were picked to finish in fourth place (tied for fourth in coaches poll) in the Big Sky. Junior guard Tyler Hall was named the preseason Big Sky MVP.

Roster

Schedule and results

|-
!colspan=9 style=| Canada exhibition trip

|-
!colspan=9 style=|Exhibition

|-
!colspan=9 style=| Non-conference regular season

|-
!colspan=9 style=| Big Sky regular season

|-
!colspan=9 style=| Big Sky tournament

See also
 2017–18 Montana State Bobcats women's basketball team

References

Montana State Bobcats men's basketball seasons
Montana State
Bob
Bob